Pierre Alain Bitôt (22 March 1822, in Podensac – 2 February 1888) was a French physician, anatomist and surgeon;remembered for describing Bitot's spots.

He attended medical school in Bordeaux, qualifying in 1846. He gained his M.D. in 1848 from the faculty of Paris, and joined the anatomy department in Bordeaux. He became Professor of anatomy in 1854, and gained his Chirurgien des Hôpitaux in 1878.

External links 

1822 births
1888 deaths
19th-century French physicians
French surgeons
French anatomists